Eileen Gleeson is the Head of Women and Girls Football for the Football Association of Ireland. She is responsible for helping to grow participation and retention of women and girls at all levels of the game, while also supporting wider football development strategies, ensuring there is a pathway for every woman and girl in Ireland to achieve their full potential. 

Gleeson left her role as manager of Glasgow City in December 2022, having previously spent two years as Assistant Coach to Vera Pauw with the Republic of Ireland Women’s National Team. With Glasgow City of the Scottish Women's Premier League she won 26, drew 3 and lost just once. She has previoulsy coached Women's National League (Ireland) clubs UCD Waves and Peamount United, who she guided to the last 32 of the 2011–12 UEFA Women's Champions League. She holds a UEFA Pro Licence since 2015.

Playing career
As a player Gleeson played in the Civil Service League with Blacklions and in the Dublin Women's Soccer League with Ballymun United and Hammond Celtic. She characterised herself as a hard-working but limited player: "I wouldn't be highlighting anything about my playing days."

Coaching career

Early coaching career
Gleeson began her coaching career with Ballymun United in the Dublin Women's Soccer League and also had a spell with St James's Gate.

Peamount United
Gleeson served as manager of Peamount United between 2006 and 2014. Under Gleeson, United became the one of the most successful women's football teams in the Republic of Ireland. She guided Peamount United to a treble in 2010, winning the Dublin Women's Soccer League title, the DWSL Premier Cup and the FAI Women's Cup. Under Gleeson, Peamount also won the inaugural 2011–12 Women's National League title and the WNL Cup in both 2012 and 2013. Gleeson also managed Peamount during their 2011–12 and 2012–13 UEFA Women's Champions League campaigns.
In 2013–14 when Stephanie Roche scored her FIFA Puskás Award-nominated goal for Peamount against Wexford Youths, it was Gleeson who uploaded footage of the goal on the internet. It later went viral on YouTube.

UCD Waves
The 2014–15 Women's National League season saw Gleeson become manager of UCD Waves. A number of Peamount United players including Julie-Ann Russell, Aine O'Gorman, Karen Duggan, Dora Gorman, Chloe Mustaki and Emily Cahill all subsequently 
followed Gleeson to UCD Waves. She quit UCD in January 2017, to focus on a PhD. She had obtained a UEFA Pro Licence in 2015.

Ireland
In September 2019, Vera Pauw, the incoming manager of the Republic of Ireland women's national football team, appointed Gleeson as her assistant. The two built a strong working relationship during Ireland's unsuccessful UEFA Women's Euro 2022 qualifying Group I campaign, and Pauw was disappointed when Gleeson accepted a head coach role with Glasgow City in October 2021.

Gleeson signed off with a 2-1 away win over Finland. The team subsequently went on to qualify for their first world cup finals appearance with a playoff win over Scotland in October 2022.

Glasgow City
Glasgow City announced that Gleeson would take over as their new head coach in November 2021, part way through the 2021–22 Scottish Women's Premier League season. Gleeson took over from Interim Head coach Grant Scott after 9 games. City were beaten to the championship by Rangers – the first time in 15 seasons that the club had failed to win the league. Defeat by Celtic in both domestic Cup finals consigned Glasgow City to their first trophyless season in 17 years.

In the 2022–23 Scottish Women's Premier League season, Glasgow City were top of the table after 12 matches under Gleesons charge. Sitting in 1st position and 2 points ahead of champions Rangers, it came as a surprise when it was announced on 19 December 2022 that Gleeson was stepping down. "I would like to sincerely express my gratitude to all at the club for providing the opportunity to be involved with such an iconic women's football club such as Glasgow City," she said. Glesson oversaw 30 league games, winning 26, drawing 3 and losing just 1 game.

Managerial career club statistics

 Gleeson joined the Glasgow City team part way through the 2021/22 season. She took charge of 18 of the 27 League games
Gleeson stepped down after 12 matches in 2022/23 to return to her employer in Dublin.

Honours
Women's National League
Winners: 2010, 2012
Runners-up: 2013, 2014, 2015, 2017
FAI Women's Cup
Winners: 2010
Runners-up: 2008, 2012, 2014, 2017
WNL Cup
Winners: 2012, 2013
Runners-up: 2015, 2016
Scottish Women's Premier League
Runners-up: 2022
Scottish Women's Cup
Runners-up: 2022
Scottish Women's Premier League Cup
Runners-up: 2021

References

External links

Republic of Ireland women's association footballers
Women's National League (Ireland) managers
Peamount United F.C.
DLR Waves
Living people
Irish association football managers
Dublin Women's Soccer League players
Women's association footballers not categorized by position
1972 births
Glasgow City F.C. managers
Scottish Women's Premier League managers